Dolichoderus perkovskyi is an extinct species of Eocene ant in the genus Dolichoderus. Described by Dlussky in 2008, fossils of the species have been found in multiple ambers, notably the Rovno amber and the Scandinavian amber.

References

†
Eocene insects
Prehistoric insects of Europe
Fossil taxa described in 2008
Fossil ant taxa
Rovno amber